The Cuban Bartenders' Club known in Spanish as Club de Cantineros de Cuba is a guild that brings together the bartenders of the Republic of Cuba.

History

The Bartenders Club of the Republic of Cuba was officially founded in Havana, Cuba, on 27 June 1924, following the approval of the governor of the City of Havana. The club is the oldest national bartenders' guild to have been officially recorded anywhere in the world.

In the 1920s, the Union of Café Employees gathered together the workforce of Cuba's hospitality industry. This association began to have major divisions among its members due to different political and social opinions, leading to its complete disintegration.

The bartender Manuel Blanco Cuétara, who had been expelled at that time from the Union of Café Employees due to internal disagreements, was one of the first to consider the creation of the Bartenders Fraternal Club of the Republic of Cuba, together with Cristóbal Alonso Álvarez, José Perales Mora (who had previously suggested to Manuel the creation of a bartending section independent from the Union of Café Employees) and José Cuervo Fernández. This idea was shared with other bartenders in Havana and Manuel Blanco himself created the first draft of the directive that would govern them.
On 28 May 1924, around ten to twelve people interested in the project met to establish an exclusive group of bartenders with sporting and socializing intentions at its heart.

The group met again on 5 June, but this time they were joined by a larger number of people that had shown an interest in the club. Throughout the meeting, which was chaired by José Cuervo himself with Cristóbal Alonso acting as secretary, the new directive was discussed and approved with certain amendments. José Cuervo proposed to lend the club some money that could be returned to him in small installments and would be invested in acquiring the materials, furniture and products necessary for the opening, thus avoiding depending on external traders (even if they were good friends).

The Cuban Bartenders Club headquarters
The Club established its first headquarters in a venue in Calle Bernaza with Obrapía in Old Havana, which was then moved to an apartment rented in the upper floors of the building located in Malecón, 15. As the tax to be paid for the apartment was considered excessive, the group decided to move to the ground floor of Avenida de la República, 69 (today's Calle San Lázaro).

For various reasons, the official headquarters were then re-located to the upper floor of Calle Prado, 105, opposite the Capitolio Nacional (National Capitol of Cuba), on 27 January 1927. On 31 May 1941, the office was moved permanently to a four-story house in Paseo del Prado, 111 that showcased the logo of the association on the ground floor. The club's logo included a symbol of the sun and the sphere of the universe as well as triangles and the phrase "Fraternity and Progress" which, although there is no firm evidence, could indicate that the Masonic institution was present in the creation and in the foundation of the club.

The building was purchased from the Canadian Bank of Commerce for 24,000 Cuban Pesos, which were sourced from the club's funds in December 1939. The building was renovated and adapted to the needs of the club and was officially opened in June 1941.
The venue was used for numerous activities and festivities on Bartender's Day which was then celebrated on the first Sunday of October (currently taking place annually on 7 October).

The celebrations on Bartender's Day also took place around the city of Havana, in locations such as the Gardens of La Tropical, La Polar and Tropicana de la Habana. It also became a tradition for the bartenders to plant a tree on that day to guarantee, in an ecological fashion, the continuity of the natural beauty of the city.

First cocktail competition
The first cocktail competition organized by the Bartenders Club took place on 16–24 November 1936 and demonstrated the high level of maturity of the young organization. The competition lasted seven days and a different spirit was used in each challenge, e.g.: on the first day, the contestants had to use white and red vermouth, rum on the second, cognac or champagne on the third, gin on the fourth, whiskey on the fifth and so on.

Publications of the Bartenders Club
"El Bar" was the first magazine to be published by the club. The magazine was created following an agreement between the members of the organization, which was approved by the General Assembly on 28 May 1926, but it was extremely short-lived.
Various projects were undertaken over the following years, but none of them managed to fit the interests of the club. In 1930, the first cocktail recipe book in Cuba was edited and collated by the Bartenders Club.
In September 1956, a monthly professional magazine called COCTEL was edited and published for the first time. Among other numerous and varied articles, one of the most prominent features explained the importance for bartenders to learn to speak English as a complement to their work and urged them to participate in the classes being offered at the club. The classes followed an effective method that included holding conversations around the bartending profession and simple grammatical training. This magazine continued to be published until 1960.

The Cuban Bartenders Association (CBA), a continuation of the Club de Cantineros
The Cuban Bartenders Club continued as an association and was officially re-registered on 6 February 1998. A year later the club changed its name to Cuban Bartenders Association.
The association's main objectives include: 
 To encourage expertise among bartenders, promoting their skills and creativity
 To facilitate the exchange of knowledge between expert and skilled bartenders and young people wanting to start a career in bartending
 To promote the use of modern international bartending techniques among Cuban mixologists
 To support all efforts focused on standardizing the preparation of cocktails and the enrichment of the bartending vocabulary through the creation and promotion of recipe books that contributed to perfecting bartending techniques
 To promote good client service and learning each customer's drinking habits and to encourage the consumption of cocktails as a more refined approach to the pleasure of drinking as well as the reduction of alcohol consumption, taking into account that the consumption of alcoholic beverages is the responsibility of both corporations and individuals 
 To contribute to the development of national products and the country's image in the international cocktail scene

Bartenders have the opportunity to showcase the skills acquired through educational courses at varied regional and national cocktail events organized by the Cuban Bartenders Association, including:
 Varadero Tradiciones, Varadero, Matanzas
 Jardines del Rey, Ciego de Ávila
 Sexto Sentido, Isla de la Juventud
 La Guantanamera, Guantánamo
 Constante Ribalaigua Event, Matanzas
The Fabio Delgado in Memoriam National Competition is the most important cocktail competition in the country, covering all levels of bartending. The competition pays tribute to one of the top bartending professionals and teachers in Cuba, Fabio Delgado, who worked to support the rescue of the Cuban Bartenders Association and died on 7 February 2003.
The bartenders who finish in 1st and 2nd place at the National Fabio Delgado In Memoriam Competition have the opportunity to participate respectively in the World Championship and in the Pan-American Competition (which also include the Friendship Cup and the Presidents Cup). These competitions take place annually and are held in the country selected by the IBA (International Bartenders Association), of which the Cuban Bartenders Association has been a member since 2002.

Cuban Cocktails included in the IBA's Cocktail Book
Global IBA: Cuba Libre, Daiquirí and Mojito (Cuban classic cocktails) and Adam y Eva (winning cocktail at the world championship).
Pan-American IBA: Cohiba Dry, Ocaso, Sabor Mediodía and Havana Fusión – all winning cocktails at the Pan-American competition.

External links 
 Website of the IBA

Clubs and societies in Cuba